is a Japanese tokusatsu superhero film, serving as the film adaptation of the 2014 Ultra Series television series Ultraman Ginga S. It was released on March 14, 2015 in Japan and legally screened in English dub by the Philippine cinema chain SM Cinema. The film will also be released on January 8, 2017 in the United States along with Ultraman X The Movie as a double feature. Actors of the English dub were announced on December 10, 2016 by SciFi Japan. The American release also coincided with the Canadian release from William Winckler Productions.

Synopsis

After brainwashing Arina to his side, the Space Time Demon Etelgar went on a quest to seal all Heisei Ultra Warriors in existence, with the recent being Cosmos on Planet Juran, who had separated Musashi to save his host while Ultraman Zero chased them within various dimensions.

On Earth, UPG members celebrated Hikaru's return from a year-long trip as he is introduced to two new members Sakuya and the rebuilt Mana. The party was interrupted by Arina and Etelgar's arrival as Victory and Ginga fought the giant demon but to no avail. Musashi joined the UPG and managed to warn the Ultras to cancel their transformations before Arina sealed them on time. During the team's recuperation and Musashi's introduction, Etelgar attacked the vicinity of Live Base as Arina fought the UPG members and Sho's attack brought her to her senses. However, the golden being had fabricated her memory into a trauma centered around Ginga and put her under her control once more. Zero fought Etelgar but even his strongest attack was easily shrugged off and only forced the latter to escape out of annoyance while Arina placed the captured Ultras on a hostage situation towards Hikaru. While the UPG members went to infiltrate the Space Time Castle, Hikaru and Sho were placed under Zero's tutelage. The success of their training taught them to cooperate and this allowed the UPG members to escape from Arina's fear-inducing influences and break the Ultras free from their imprisonment. Musashi rejoined with Cosmos and the rest of the Heisei Ultras empower the Ultra Fusion Brace.

As things went beyond his expectations, Etelgar manipulated the citizens' fears and created a gigantic copy of Dark Lugiel. Hikaru and Sho perform the Ultra Touch and bring forth an Ultra Warrior resulted from their alter-ego's combination: Ultraman Gingavictory. The new figure easily phased through Dark Lugiel's attack and destroyed it via Gingavictory Breaker. Joined by the rest of the Heisei Ultra Warriors, the group marched towards the tower, but Etelgar created multiple copies of their past enemies, leaving Cosmos and Gingavictory to reach the upper level. Etelgar and Arina attacked them with their full strength until Cosmos assumed Eclipse Mode, purifying Arina from Etelgar's influence. Through Hikaru's persuasion, Arina manages to regain her memories and finally brought by Cosmos from safety, as Gingavictory resumes battle. The other Ultra Warriors emerge victorious from their battles and Gingavictory chased Etelgar to space, now finally realised his true motives behind the captures of the Ultra Warriors, which is due to their bonds with humanity before finishing him for good with Ultra Fusion Shoot. The rest of the Ultra Warriors soon destroyed the Space Time Castle with Crossover Formation.

With the rest of the Heisei Ultras return, Musashi/Cosmos volunteer to deliver Arina to her home after entrusting the safety of the Earth to UPG, Hikaru and Sho. Sho was later recruited into the ranks of UPG and the rest of the crew saluted to the viewers after the ending credits roll.

Production
This movie is first announced in November 2014. Takuya Negishi, actor of Hikaru Raido stated that his favorite Ultraman as a child is Ultraman Cosmos and is delighted to work alongside Musashi's actor, Taiyo Sugiura.

Cast

Japanese cast
Actors
/: 
/: 
: 
/: 
: 
: 
: 
: 
: 
: 
: 

Voice actors
: 
: 
: 
: 
: 
: 
: 
Jiangshi: 
: 
: 
Ginga Spark Voice:

English dub actors
Hikaru Raido/Ultraman Ginga: Nicholas Clark
Sho/Ultraman Victory: Bryan Forrest
Arina: Beth Ann Sweeze
Musashi Haruno/Ultraman Cosmos: Paul Stanko
Arisa Sugita: Lisle Wilkerson
Gōki Matsumoto: John Katona
Tomoya Ichijōji: Chad Comey
Sakuya: Annie Knudsen
Mana: Lib Campbell
Yoshiaki Jinno: William Winckler
Ultraman Zero: Daniel Van Thomas
Ultraman Dyna: Bradford Hill
Ultraman Gaia: Chris Cleveland
Ultraman Mebius: Nicholas Manelick
Ultraman Tiga: Jay Dee Witney
Ultraman Nexus: Joe Chambrello
Ultraman Max, Spark Device voice: Frank Gerrish
Etelgar: G. Larry Butler

Spin-off
The miniseries Ultra Fight Victory was released as a spin-off of the film.

Theme song
Ending theme

Lyrics: 
Composition & Arrangement: Takao Konishi
Artist: Voyager with Hikaru & Show (Takuya Negishi & Kiyotaka Uji) feat. Takamiy

Lyrics: Hideki Tama, Sei Okazaki
Composition & Arrangement: Takao Konishi
Artist: Voyager with Hikaru & Show (Takuya Negishi & Kiyotaka Uji) feat. Takamiy

References

External links
Ultraman Ginga at Tsuburaya Productions 

2015 films
2010s Japanese-language films
Ultra Series films
Shochiku films
2010s Japanese films